NITB may refer to:

 Northern Ireland Tourist Board
 National Institute of Technology, Bhopal